Oakamoor Tunnel is a disused  long tunnel located north of Oakamoor railway station on the former Uttoxeter to North Rode section of the North Staffordshire Railway.

The tunnel opened with the line in 1849. The tunnel was closed in 1964 with the withdrawal of passenger and freight service between Uttoxeter and Oakamoor Sand Sidings (just north of the tunnel).

The tunnel is complete, in quite good condition.

Tunnels completed in 1849
Railway tunnels in England
North Staffordshire Railway
Tunnels in Staffordshire
1849 establishments in England